Greenland is an unincorporated community and census-designated place (CDP) in Greenland Township, Ontonagon County, Michigan, United States. State highway M-38 forms the northern edge of the community, leading northwest  to Ontonagon, the county seat, and east  to Baraga. 

Greenland was first listed as a CDP prior to the 2020 census.

Demographics

References 

Census-designated places in Ontonagon County, Michigan
Census-designated places in Michigan
Unincorporated communities in Ontonagon County, Michigan
Unincorporated communities in Michigan